Mount Sterling may refer to:

Places

United States
 Mount Sterling, Alabama, an unincorporated community
 Mount Sterling, Illinois, a city and county seat
 Mount Sterling, Indiana, an unincorporated community
 Mount Sterling, Iowa, a city
 Mount Sterling, Kentucky, a home rule-class city
 Mount Sterling, Missouri, an unincorporated community
 Mount Sterling, North Carolina, a mountain
 Mount Sterling, Ohio, a village
 Mount Sterling, Wisconsin, a village
 Mount Sterling Township, Brown County, Illinois

See also
 Mount Stirling, a mountain, Victoria, Australia
 Mount Stirling (Providence Forge, Virginia), a historic house in the United States